Nebankh was an ancient Egyptian official of the Thirteenth Dynasty. He is one of the better known personalities of this period.

Family 

Nebankh was the son of the steward Sobekhotep. His mother is named Hapyu. His brother Dedusobek Bebi was the father of queen Nubkhaes.

Career

King's Acquaintance
At Konosso, an inscription listing the members of the royal family of Neferhotep I, also shows treasurer Senebi and king's acquaintance Nebankh. Another colleague was king's acquaintance Rehuankh.

High Steward
Under king Sobekhotep IV he became high steward. In this position he went on expeditions to the Wadi Hammamat and Wadi el-Hudi.

Other attestations
Nebankh is known from a high number of monuments, including rock inscriptions and several stelae and a statue, found at Abydos. His heart scarab is so far the oldest datable heart scarab. It is a human-headed green jasper heart scarab with nine lines of hieroglyphics bearing the name of Nebankh.

References 

Ancient Egyptian high stewards
Officials of the Thirteenth Dynasty of Egypt